Lynda Clark may refer to:

 Lynda Clark, Baroness Clark of Calton (born 1949), Scottish judge and politician
 Lynda Clark (author) (born 1981), author and creator of interactive fiction